Nyctixalus margaritifer, also known as the Java Indonesian treefrog and pearly tree frog, is a species of frog in the family Rhacophoridae. It is endemic to Java, Indonesia, where it is known from a number of records at elevations above .

Description
Adult males measure  and adult females  in snout–vent length. The body is slender and flattened. The tympanum is distinct. The fingers and toes are slender and bear medium-sized terminal discs. Skin is coarsely granular. Coloration is orange to dark brown, with yellow spots on the eyelids and shoulders.

Habitat and conservation
Nyctixalus margaritifer occurs in undisturbed highland forests, but it is also known from coffee plantations with adequate forest canopy cover. Breeding takes place in tree holes.

Nyctixalus margaritifer is a rare species. It is threatened by forest loss. It is found in Mount Halimun Salak National Park and Gunung Gede Pangrango National Park. There is also an unconfirmed record from Mount Merapi National Park. Single specimens are also known from Telaga Warna Nature Reserve and from very close to Gunung Sigogor Nature Reserve.

References

margaritifer
Amphibians of Indonesia
Endemic fauna of Java
Taxa named by George Albert Boulenger
Amphibians described in 1882
Taxonomy articles created by Polbot